The 2007 Football League Trophy Final was the 24th final of the domestic football cup competition for teams from Football Leagues One and Two, the Football League Trophy. The final was played at the Millennium Stadium in Cardiff on 1 April 2007, the last time that the final would be played in the stadium. The match was contested by Bristol Rovers and Doncaster Rovers. Doncaster won the match 3–2 with Graeme Lee scoring the winning goal twenty minutes into extra-time.

Background

Summary

Match details

Route to the final

Bristol Rovers

Doncaster Rovers

Post-match

References

External links
Official website
Soccerbase match profile

EFL Trophy Finals
Football League Trophy Final 2007
Football League Trophy Final 2007
Trophy Final
Football League Trophy Final
Football League Trophy Final